The Mayflower Compact, originally titled Agreement Between the Settlers of New Plymouth, was the first governing document of  Plymouth Colony. It was written by the men aboard the Mayflower, consisting of Separatist Puritans, adventurers, and tradesmen. Although the agreement contained a pledge of loyalty to the King, the Puritans and other Protestant Separatists were dissatisfied with the state of the Church of England, the limited extent of the English Reformation and reluctance of King James I of England to enforce further reform. 

Signing the covenant were 41 of the ship's 101 passengers; the Mayflower was anchored in Provincetown Harbor within the hook at the northern tip of Cape Cod.

History
The Pilgrims had originally hoped to reach America in early October using two ships, but delays and complications meant they could use only one, the Mayflower. Their intended destination had been the Colony of Virginia, with the journey financed by the Company of Merchant Adventurers of London. Storms forced them to anchor at the hook of Cape Cod in Massachusetts, however, as it was unwise to continue with provisions running short. This inspired some of the non-Puritan passengers (whom the Puritans referred to as "Strangers") to proclaim that they "would use their own liberty; for none had power to command them" since they would not be settling in the agreed-upon Virginia territory. To prevent this, the Pilgrims determined to establish their own government, while still affirming their allegiance to the Crown of England. Thus, the Mayflower Compact was based simultaneously upon a majoritarian model and the settlers' allegiance to the king. It was in essence a social contract in which the settlers consented to follow the community's rules and regulations for the sake of order and survival. 

Similar arguments had been unsuccessfully made by the shipwrecked passengers of the Sea Venture, a similar, earlier group bound for the Colony of Virginia, and specifically by one Stephen Hopkins, who had, as a result, been convicted of mutiny and sentenced to death, but pardoned, and is thought to be the Stephen Hopkins aboard the Mayflower and among the Compact signatories.

The Pilgrims had lived for some years in Leiden, a city in the Dutch Republic. Historian Nathaniel Philbrick states, "Just as a spiritual covenant had marked the beginning of their congregation in Leiden, a civil covenant would provide the basis for a secular government in America."

Text 

The original document has been lost, but three versions exist from the 17th century: printed in Mourt's Relation (1622), which was reprinted in Purchas his Pilgrimes (1625); hand-written by William Bradford in his journal Of Plimoth Plantation (1646); and printed by Bradford's nephew Nathaniel Morton in New-Englands Memorial (1669). The three versions differ slightly in wording and significantly in spelling, capitalization, and punctuation. William Bradford wrote the first part of Mourt's Relation, including its version of the compact, so he wrote two of the three versions. The wording of those two versions is quite similar, unlike that of Morton. Bradford's handwritten manuscript is kept in a vault at the State Library of Massachusetts.

Signers 

A list of 41 male passengers who signed the document was supplied by Bradford's nephew Nathaniel Morton in his 1669 New England's Memorial. Thomas Prince first numbered the names in his 1736 A Chronological History of New-England in the form of Annals. The original document has been lost, so Morton is the sole source for the signers. He probably had access to the original document, but he could not have known the actual order in which it was signed simply by inspecting it. Morton's arrangement of names might not have been the arrangement on the original document, and the names on the original may not have been arranged in any orderly fashion. Prince's numbers are based solely on Morton, as he himself stated.

Morton's list of names was unnumbered and untitled in all six editions (1669–1855), although their order changed with successive editions. In his original 1669 edition, the names were placed on two successive pages forming six short columns, three per page. In subsequent editions, these six short columns were combined into three long columns on a single page in two different ways, producing two different orders in unnumbered lists of signers. The second (1721) and third (1772) editions changed the order of the first edition by combining the first and fourth columns into the first long column, and similarly for the other columns. The fifth (1826) and sixth (1855) editions returned the names to their original first edition order by combining the first and second short columns into the first long column, and similarly for the other columns. Prince numbered the names in their original 1669 Morton order. He added titles (Mr. or Capt.) to 11 names that were given those titles by William Bradford in the list of passengers at the end of his manuscript.

The following list of signers is organized into the six short columns of Morton (1669) with the numbers and titles of Prince. The names are given their modern spelling according to Morison. Use the numbers for the order used by genealogists and half of unnumbered lists (Samuel Fuller will be the eighth name), but merge the half columns vertically into full columns for the order used by the other half of unnumbered lists (John Turner will be the eighth name).

Legacy 
On November 23, 1920 at a commemoration ceremony for the 300th anniversary of the Mayflower landing, then Massachusetts governor Calvin Coolidge, who became the 30th U.S. President a few years later, said the following about the Mayflower Compact:

See also
 Fundamental Orders of Connecticut (1638)
 Instrument of Government (1653)
 List of Mayflower passengers
 List of Mayflower passengers who died in the winter of 1620–1621
 Mayflower
 Mayflower Compact signatories
 Mayflower passengers who died at sea November/December 1620

References

External links 

"Mayflower Compact" at History Channel

1620 in the Thirteen Colonies
American political philosophy literature
History of the Thirteen Colonies
Mayflower
Modern philosophical literature
Plymouth Colony
Political charters
Provincetown, Massachusetts
Thirteen Colonies documents
United States documents